Steven Andrew Thomas (born in April 1989), known online as Steve1989MREInfo, Steve MRE, or Steve1989, is an American YouTuber and military history commentator, best known for his YouTube video content in which he unboxes and tastes new, old, obscure, or foreign military rations.

Early life 
Thomas's interest in military rations began in 1997 as a young boy when his uncle purchased a case of Meal, Ready-to-Eat (MRE) rations from a surplus store. The first ration Thomas ate from the case was a ham slice meal manufactured in 1993, which he ate cold because he did not know how to use the included flameless ration heater. Despite his dedication to military rations, Thomas has not served in any military.

Internet career 
Thomas began his YouTube channel in November 2015. He first gained notoriety in January 2016 for a video in which he ate 61-year-old peanut butter from a Korean War-era C-ration. Later that year, a video review of Thomas eating American Civil War-era hardtack from 1863 went viral.

Thomas has reviewed both vintage and contemporary rations from a wide variety of armed forces from across the world, including those from the British, Canadian, Russian, Ukrainian, Australian, and Chinese militaries. He has reviewed a variety of military chocolate, including the World War II-era D-ration and Tropical Bar, both manufactured by The Hershey Company. Thomas smokes, and he has smoked and reviewed cigarettes included in older rations, with the oldest cigarette he smoked being a 123-year-old cigarette dating to 1897.

Thomas' video voice-overs have gained traction within his subscriber community for their calm delivery, and signature catch-phrases such as "nice hiss" (when opening a item results in audible air movement) and "Let's get this out onto a tray. Nice!" (referencing laying out the ration items onto a table, before hard-cutting to them neatly arrayed on a mess kit).

Because many of the rations Thomas opens are extremely rare, he has stated that he will only open and review a ration once he has obtained a duplicate that will remain unopened in a private collection.

Complications 
Despite eating rations that are well beyond the recommended shelf life specified by manufacturers, Thomas has reported that he rarely becomes ill from eating them. As of 2023, he is only known to have become ill from two rations—a Ukrainian ration in 2015 (before his YouTube channel began) due to which he was hospitalized for E. coli; and a Chinese PLA Type 13 ration in 2019, which he harshly criticized in his review of—both of which were one year old and in-date when he ate them. He has described a cheese spread from a 1987 MRE as "the grossest thing I've ever tasted, because it literally felt like fire. And bitterness."

Thomas took a brief hiatus in mid-2020 after injuring tendons in his right arm, according to his pinned YouTube comment in the comments section of his then-most-recent video. He made the video as soon as the brace was removed from his arm.

See also 
 Eating History
 Max Miller (YouTuber)
 List of YouTube personalities

References

External links 
 

1989 births
Living people
20th-century American people
21st-century American people
American YouTubers
Video bloggers
YouTube channels launched in 2015
People from Lakeland, Florida